Selin Şekerci (born 1 June 1989) is a Turkish actress.

Life and career

Selin Şekerci was born in İzmir on 1 June 1989 from an Arab father and Azerbaijani mother. She completed primary and secondary school education in İzmir. She participated in İzmir State Theater's plays. She played in private theaters and children's plays in İzmir. She graduated from Istanbul Bilgi University, the department of cinema-television. After coming to Istanbul, she played in many commercials.

She had guest roles in Kavak Yelleri Turkish version of Dawson's Creek and hit surreal comedy Leyla ile Mecnun. After acting in popular youth series Melekler Korusun as Özgür, she became popular. She had a leading role in romantic comedy series Kaçak Gelinler and became known for her portrayal of the character Şebnem Gürsoy in the show.She has played in many TV series.

Filmography

References

External link
 

1989 births
Living people
Turkish people of Arab descent
Turkish people of Azerbaijani descent
Turkish television actresses
21st-century Turkish actresses